The Wizard of Loneliness is a 1988 American drama film directed by Jenny Bowen and starring Lukas Haas, Lea Thompson, Lance Guest, Dylan Baker, and John Randolph. It is based on the 1966 book of the same name by John Nichols.

Premise
Young Wendall Oler is sent to live with his Aunt Sybil and Uncle John when his father is called on to fight in World War II. Lonely and unhappy, Wendall harbors the delusion that he possesses amazing powers and becomes involved in some family secrets.

Cast
 Lukas Haas as Wendall Oler
 Lea Thompson as Aunt Sybil
 Lance Guest as Uncle John
 Dylan Baker as Duffy Kahler
 John Randolph as Doc
 David Moscow as Jimmy Wiggen
 Anne Pitoniak as Cornelia
 Jason Cook as Monroe
 Ken Jenkins as Joel Spender
 Michael Buhl as Chad Spender

References

External links
 
 
 

1988 films
1980s coming-of-age drama films
1988 independent films
American coming-of-age drama films
American independent films
Films based on American novels
Films set in the 1940s
Films set in Vermont
Films set on the home front during World War II
Films shot in Vermont
1988 drama films
1980s English-language films
1980s American films